The Bhamdoun synagogue is a synagogue built in Bhamdoun (Aley district, Lebanon) in 1922. It is one of the four big synagogues in Lebanon. Its structure still stands despite the building being abandoned.

See also 

 Wadi Abu Jamil (former Jewish quarter in Beirut).
 Deir el Qamar Synagogue.
 Sidon Synagogue.

References 

Edot HaMizrach
Jewish Lebanese history
Jews and Judaism in Beirut
Sephardi Jewish culture in Asia
Sephardi synagogues
Synagogues in Lebanon